Tigh Siah (also Romanized as Tīgh Sīāh; also known as Tīk-e Sīāh, Tīk Seyāh, and Tīk Sīāh) is a village in Bondar Rural District, Senderk District, Minab County, Hormozgan Province, Iran. At the 2006 census, its population was 60, in 11 families.

References 

Populated places in Minab County